Inez may refer to:

People
 Inez, a woman's given name
 Inez (singer), Danish singer
 Inéz, Estonian artist

Places
 Inez, Kentucky, United States
 Inez, Nebraska
 Inez, Texas, United States
Inez, West Virginia

Other uses
 Hurricane Inez
 Inez (novel), by Carlos Fuentes